Western Spirit Football Club are an Australian football (soccer) club from Goodna, a suburb of Ipswich, Queensland, Australia. The club was formed in 2005 from a merger between Goodna Soccer Club and Camira Soccer Club and currently play in Brisbane Premier League Division 1. They narrowly missed out on promotion in 2015 finishing 3rd and then going on to make the Grand final, going down to Souths United 3–0.

The club draws its members mainly from the outer Brisbane suburbs Goodna, Camira, Springfield, Redbank Plains, Forest Lake, Inala and even Greenbank.
Although Western Spirit is a relatively new club it is one of the largest clubs in the Ipswich area, as well as being 1 of only 3 clubs in the district to have 2 or more fields being in ownership of the club. The club offers almost every age-group and gender, membership, with members participating in an active team.

Football Kit

References

Soccer clubs in Queensland
Brisbane Premier League teams
Association football clubs established in 2005
2005 establishments in Australia